Nibhaz ( Nīḇḥaz) was a deity of the Avim during the time of Shalmaneser I.  Some indications of worship have been found in Syria, between Berytus and Tripolis, in the form of a dog, a contention first found in the Talmud. Others identify Nibhaz with the Persian god Ibnakhaza or even with the Babylonian Nebo. Those who understand Nibhaz as being related to dogs tie it to the Egyptian deity Anubis.

References 

Deities in the Hebrew Bible
Mesopotamian deities